The culture of Los Angeles is rich with arts and ethnically diverse. The greater Los Angeles metro area has several notable art museums including the Los Angeles County Museum of Art (LACMA), the J. Paul Getty Museum on the Santa Monica Mountains overlooking the Pacific, the Museum of Contemporary Art (MOCA), and the Hammer Museum. In the 1920s and 1930s Will Durant and Ariel Durant, Arnold Schoenberg and other intellectuals were the representatives of culture, in addition to the movie writers and directors. As the city flourished financially in the middle of the 20th century, culture followed. Boosters such as Dorothy Buffum Chandler and other philanthropists raised funds for the establishment of art museums, music centers and theaters. Today, the Southland cultural scene is as complex, sophisticated and varied as any in the world.

History 

The history of Los Angeles began in 1781 when 44 settlers from New Spain established a permanent settlement in what is now Downtown Los Angeles, as instructed by Spanish Governor of Las Californias, Felipe de Neve, and authorized by Viceroy Antonio María de Bucareli. This piece of history has been marked by a monument named  "El Pueblo". After sovereignty changed from Mexico to the United States in 1848, great changes came from the completion of the Santa Fe railroad line from Chicago to Los Angeles in 1885. "Overlanders" flooded in, mostly white Protestants from the Lower Midwest and South. Los Angeles began to grow as the built their first firehouse station in 1884 and the first home was built by Francisco Avila in 1818.

Los Angeles had a strong economic base in farming, oil, tourism, real estate and movies. It grew rapidly with many suburban areas inside and outside the city limits. Its motion picture industry made the city world-famous, and World War II brought new industry, especially high-tech aircraft construction. Politically the city was moderately conservative, with a weak labor union sector.

Since the 1960s, growth has slowed—and traffic delays have become infamous. Los Angeles was a pioneer in freeway development as the public transit system deteriorated. New arrivals, especially from Mexico and Asia, have transformed the demographic base since the 1960s. Old industries have declined, including farming, oil, military and aircraft, but tourism, entertainment and high-tech remain strong. Over time, droughts and wildfires have increased in frequency and become less seasonal and more year-round, further straining the city's water security.

The arts

Architecture 

Los Angeles has many different types of architectural styles scattered throughout the city and nearby satellite cities. Los Angeles has a rich, diverse history of architectural works, having been known throughout professional architectural circles as a testbed for architecture. The case study houses in particular revolutionized residential architecture. Architects such as Richard Neutra, Jack Charney, Pierre Koenig, John Lautner and Frank Lloyd Wright all have important works in the city. Some of the different types of architectural styles throughout the city and metropolitan area are mission revival, Spanish colonial revival, craftsman, Norman French provincial, French chateau, English Tudor, beaux arts, art deco, and streamline moderne.

In downtown Los Angeles, there are several buildings constructed in the Art Deco style. In recognition of this heritage, the recently built Metropolitan Transit Authority building incorporates subtle Art Deco characteristics.

Modern architecture in the city ranges from the works of pioneering African-American architect Paul Williams, to the iconoclastic deconstructivist forms of Frank Gehry, a long-time resident of the city. Charles Eames and his wife Ray Eames designed famous chairs and other domestic goods.

Visual arts in Los Angeles 

The plein air movement of impressionistic landscape painting found early adherents in the Los Angeles area. Instrumental in the development of the genre was the California Art Club (est. 1909) that provided numerous exhibitions and lectures. The art form continues to be recognized as a signature style of California art.  Much of the energy in the city's art scene in the 1945 to 1980 stretch came from private collectors, artists' collectives, print shops, art schools and especially from commercial galleries.

In the 1960s, Corita Kent, then known as Sister Mary Corita of Immaculate Heart College, created bright, bold serigraphs carrying the messages of love and peace.

Public art in Los Angeles 
See List of public art in Los Angeles

The 1926 Central Library designed by Bertram Goodhue was an architectural masterpiece incorporating murals and sculptures throughout, notably four rotunda murals by Dean Cornwell depicting California history.
 Los Angeles is known for its murals, and many outdoor public art murals have been painted throughout the 20th century by early Mexican muralists Diego Rivera, David Alfaro Siqueiros and José Clemente Orozco.

During the 1960s and 1970s, the Chicano art movement took a strong hold in Los Angeles. Much of the work produced followed the Mexican muralist tradition of sending potent social messages. Works produced in this era included East Los Streetscapers, Judy Baca and others. Chicano arts in Los Angeles also gave rise to the internationally renowned Self Help Graphics & Art, known for its Corita Kent-influenced serigraphs and its annual Día de los Muertos festival.

Public Art in the downtown area of Los Angeles during the 1970s was characterized by large abstract sculptures such as Herbert Bayer's Double Ascension (1973), and Alexander Calder's Four Arches (1973) installed with the commercial redevelopment of Bunker Hill.  In 1989 the City passed an ordinance requiring developers to contribute one percent of the cost of construction of new buildings to a public art fund.  The resulting funds for public art and public art programs in the 1990s, coupled with substantial subway and light rail transit in the 1990s, created public art installations in new rail stations and public spaces throughout the city and beyond.

Chris Burden's Urban Light (2008) in front of the Los Angeles County Museum of Art on Wilshire Boulevard attracts hundreds of visitors daily, has been featured in several films as an iconic image of Los Angeles, and has become a tourist destination and popular public space.

Art museums and galleries 
See List of museums in Los Angeles

There are 841 museums and art galleries in Los Angeles County. In fact, Los Angeles has more museums per capita than any other city in the world. Some of the notable museums are the Los Angeles County Museum of Art (the largest art museum in the Western United States), the Getty Center (part of the larger J. Paul Getty Trust, the world's wealthiest art institution), the Battleship Iowa, and the Museum of Contemporary Art. A significant number of art galleries are located on Gallery Row, and tens of thousands attend the monthly Downtown Art Walk there.

In 1943, a community-run arts association in Pasadena merged with the better funded Pasadena Art Institute and moved into what is now the home of the Pacific Asia Museum. Renamed the Pasadena Art Museum, it organized some of the most adventurous and cutting edge shows of contemporary art in the region, notably, an early Pop art show in 1962, and a Marcel Duchamp retrospective in 1963. Although the city had a long tradition of visual arts supported by private collectors and galleries, Los Angeles did not have a comprehensive museum of art until 1965, when LACMA opened its doors. At about the same time, La Cienega Boulevard became home to many art galleries, most notably Ferus, featuring works by artists who lived in the area, Dwan Gallery, and Riko Mizuno Gallery. Although Andy Warhol was New York based, the famous "soup cans" were first exhibited at Ferus. A local exponent of pop art was Ed Ruscha, some of whose work was representational, others consisted of simple slogans or mottoes which were usually humorous, being so far out of the context where such statements would normally appear. An example of this is Nice Hot Vegetables Larry Bell, for example, explored the interaction of a sculpture to its environment, demonstrating that the boundaries are usually not entirely clear. David Hockney, an English immigrant, produced figurative paintings set in idyllic Southern California locales, such as swimming pools in the bright sunlight, belonging to modernist houses. Although these paintings are representational, they seem to be composed of small color patches, somewhat like collages. Finish Fetish—a style that emphasized gleaming surfaces—and Light and Space—art about perception—were other Ferus-bred styles that allowed L.A. to distinguish itself from the rest of the art world. It was during this period that the contemporary arts scene in Los Angeles began to command the attention of collectors and museum directors internationally.

Some of the most respected art museums in the world can be found in Los Angeles. They include the Los Angeles County Museum of Art, the Broad, the J. Paul Getty Museum, the Norton Simon Museum, the Huntington Library art collection and botanical gardens, and the Hammer Museum at the University of California, Los Angeles. Los Angeles is known for its expansive collections of contemporary art- the Museum of Contemporary Art has three separate incarnations: the Geffen Contemporary, for larger installation pieces by more renowned artists, the MOCA Downtown, its standard collection, and the Pacific Palisades, a large, multi-purpose building in modernist style that houses offices as well as stores and showrooms for contemporary graphic design, architecture, and interior design. Other smaller art museums in the city include the Craft Contemporary, the California African American Museum, and many sculpture gardens throughout the city, including those at the American Jewish University and the Franklin D. Murphy Sculpture Garden. Private art collections that are open to the public are the ones by Eli Broad and the Frederick R. Weisman Art Foundation.  The growth of Los Angeles as an art capital was first comprehensively documented in a series of exhibitions partially funded and spearheaded by the Getty, but held at all major museums during the Fall of 2011. "The exhibitions, and the events that accompanied them as part of "Pacific Standard Time" demonstrated the pivotal role played by Southern California in national and international artistic movements since the middle of the 20th century. LA Plaza de Cultura y Artes (The culture square and arts museum) a Mexican-American museum and cultural center opened in April 2011. The museum contains interactive exhibits designed by experience design expert Tali Krakowsky such as a reconstruction of a 1920s Main Street. The museum shares the stories of the history, cultures, values, and traditions of Mexicans, Mexican Americans, and all Latinos in Los Angeles and Southern California. Art institutions from Santa Barbara to San Diego are joining together to create programs that highlighted the region's vibrant artistic scene." Culver City's La Cienega Boulevard features one of the highest concentrations of fine art galleries and studios in Southern California. The trendy bohemian neighborhoods of Silver Lake and Los Feliz are home to numerous smaller galleries, showcasing local or underground art. Gallery Row downtown is known for its small DIY galleries, such as The Smell, which doubles as a punk and noise music venue.

Art schools and colleges 
Los Angeles County is home to three professional art colleges, Art Center College of Design, founded on 1930 in downtown Los Angeles as the Art Center School, Otis College of Art and Design, which was founded in 1917 as Otis Art Institute, and California Institute of the Arts, founded in 1961 as successor of the Chouinard Art Institute.

Cuisine 

Los Angeles is the home of the Cobb Salad, invented in the Brown Derby restaurant in Hollywood, the French-Dip sandwich, originated early in the 20th century by either Cole's Pacific Electric Buffet or Phillippe's—both of which still exist downtown, the ice blended coffee drink by Coffee Bean & Tea Leaf and Original Tommy's Hamburger. In 2018, PETA declared Los Angeles to be the "most vegan-friendly city" in the world.

The strength of the city's scene is in "ethnic" dining and it is considered to be one of the most dynamic scenes in the world in terms of range and depth. Los Angeles has an enormous variety of restaurants. In its predominantly African American neighborhoods are soul food restaurants such as Roscoe's House of Chicken and Waffles. According to Oxford Encyclopedia of Food and Drink in America, Los Angeles "remains the United States's preeminent city to eat regional Mexican food." The city of Glendale has among the highest concentration of Armenian restaurants in the country.

Given its close proximity to Asia and constant flow of Asian immigrants, Asian food has a large foothold in Los Angeles. Japanese, Chinese, Vietnamese, Korean and Thai restaurants are extremely common place. Japanese food in particular is a staple of Los Angeles' haute cuisine scene with places like Urasawa in Beverly Hills, Nobu in Malibu and Koi in Hollywood. California-styled cuisine is considered to be highly influenced by Asian seafood, as well as by Mediterranean cooking. The popularity of Asian food inspired food festivals such as 626 Night Market in Arcadia, where vendors sell traditional night market foods such as stinky tofu and skewers as well as modern fusion food such as ramen burgers and pho tacos.

Cinema 

The greater Los Angeles area is the most important site in the United States for movie and television production. This has drawn not only actors, but also writers, composers, artists, and other creative individuals to the area.

The area is home to many institutes that give awards annually for movie and television production such as the Academy of Motion Picture Arts and Sciences and the Academy of Television Arts & Sciences. There are many Film festivals, like the Los Angeles Gay and Lesbian Film Festival conducted by Outfest and Dances with Films held at the TCL Chinese Theatre. Specialty theatres like Quentin Tarantino's New Beverly Cinema and art houses like the Nuart Theatre screen eclectic mixes of new and historic movies.

Hollywood 

Hollywood is a neighborhood in the central region of Los Angeles, California. This ethnically diverse, densely populated neighborhood is notable as the home of the U.S. film industry, including several of its historic studios, and its name has come to be a shorthand reference for the industry and the people in it.

Although film production in Los Angeles remains the most important center for the medium, Hollywood has become more international, thus it faces increasing competition, however, from other parts of the United States and from the Canadian cities of Vancouver, British Columbia and Toronto, Ontario as well as numerous other countries around the world such as Romania and Australasia that provide Hollywood with lower production costs. The phenomenon of entertainment companies running away to other locales in search of lower labor and production costs is known as "runaway production" although the trend shows signs of reversing due to the state's current Film & Television Tax Credit Program administered by the California Film Commission.

The motion picture and TV industries have helped create the image that defines Los Angeles across the world. Many tourists flock to see Hollywood-related landmarks such as the Walk of Fame and the Hollywood Sign.

Literature & Comic Books 
Los Angeles's literary history includes legendary authors like Raymond Chandler, whose hard-boiled detective stories were set in pre-war and immediate post-war L.A. Ross Macdonald carried on the Chandler tradition into the 1950s, and in the 1960s and 1970s blended it with themes of classical tragedy. Walter Mosley, James Ellroy and Joseph Hansen are among the local successors to Chandler. Nathanael West's book, The Day of the Locust, depicted a raw side to the Hollywood dream. Ray Bradbury wrote science fiction after moving to the city in 1934. Actress Carrie Fisher found success as a novelist. The best known local poet was Charles Bukowski, who mostly lived in Hollywood but in the later part of his life lived in San Pedro. Tens of thousands of screenplays have been written by L.A. city residents, and the movie business has attracted many authors, including F. Scott Fitzgerald, Aldous Huxley, Tennessee Williams, Evelyn Waugh, and William Faulkner.

Los Angeles County boasts a plethora of independent bookstores like Book Soup and Skylight Books, as well as a number of literary magazines like The Los Angeles Review, Slake, The Santa Monica Review, and Black Clock. Los Angeles has many public library branches, including the architecturally renowned Central Library. This city is also home to The Last Bookstore, which is the largest in California, and in West Coast Besides Powell's Books.

Fiction 
Los Angeles has provided fertile territory for writers of fiction with crime fiction being a common genre for stories about the city. During the 20th century, fiction portraying the city has highlighted the complexity of the city and the discontinuities between its public image and the reality of living there. The size and scale of the city have also provided crime writers with a suitably complex city against which to set their stories. Works that explore life in the city include:
 James Robert Baker, "Fuel-Injected Dreams", 1986; "Boy Wonder", 1988
 Raymond Chandler,The Big Sleep, 1939
 Raymond Chandler,Farewell My Lovely, 1940
 Raymond Chandler,The Long Goodbye, 1953
 Joan Didion, Play it As it Lays, 1970
 Bret Easton Ellis, Less Than Zero, 1985
 James Ellroy, Black Dahlia, 1987
 James Ellroy, LA Confidential, 1990
 James Ellroy, White Jazz, 1992
 John Fante, Ask the Dust, 1939
 Roger L. Simon, The Moses Wine series, starting with The Big Fix, 1973
 Evelyn Waugh, The Loved One, 1947.
 Nathanael West, Day of the Locust, 1939.
 Michael Connelly, Harry Bosch Series, starting with The Black Echo, 1992–present
 Gerald Jay Goldberg, Heart Payments, 1982.
 Gerald Jay Goldberg, 126 Days of Continuous Sunshine, 1972.
 Charles Bukowski, Post Office, 1971.
 Nina Revoyr, Southland, 2003.
 Héctor Tobar, The Barbarian Nurseries, 2011.
 Mary Helen Ponce, Hoyt Street: A Autobiography, 2006.
 Chester Himes, "If He Hollers Let Him Go", 1945.

Music 

Los Angeles is also one of the most important cities in the world for the recorded music industry. The landmark Capitol Records building, which resembles a stack of albums, is representative of this. A&M Records long occupied a studio off Sunset Boulevard built by Charlie Chaplin (who wrote the music for his own films). The Warner Brothers built a major recording business in addition to their film business. At the other end of the business, local Rhino Records began a reissue boom by digging through archives of old recordings and repackaging them for modern audiences.

Los Angeles had a vibrant African-American musical community even when it was relatively small: a number of musical artists congregated around Central Avenue, and the community produced a number of great talents, including Charles Mingus, Buddy Collette, Gerald Wilson, and others in the 1930s and 1940s before disappearing in the 1950s.

In the 1960s, the Sunset Strip became a breeding ground for bands like The Byrds, Buffalo Springfield, and The Doors. Randy Newman also started his career during this time, and the Beach Boys were founded in nearby Hawthorne during this same decade as well. Much hard rock has come out of Los Angeles, including legendary hard rockers Van Halen from nearby Pasadena, "hair bands" like Mötley Crüe, Ratt, W.A.S.P., and Guns N' Roses, thrash metal acts like Megadeth, Metallica (who later relocated to San Francisco) and Slayer (from Huntington Park), and also 1990s rock bands such as Jane's Addiction, Korn, The Offspring, and the Red Hot Chili Peppers. Softer rock acts also flourished, as evidenced by the Eagles and Linda Ronstadt during the 1970s. There was a sizeable punk rock movement which spawned the hardcore punk movement featuring bands like X, Black Flag and Wasted Youth. In the 1980s, the Paisley Underground movement was native to Los Angeles. In the 1990s and early 21st century, Los Angeles' contribution to rock music continued with acclaimed artists such as Beck, Sublime of Long Beach, Tool, System of a Down, Rage Against the Machine, Crazy Town, No Doubt, Linkin Park, The Calling, Incubus, Hoobastank, Lifehouse, Eve 6, Sugar Ray, Deftones, Papa Roach, Alien Ant Farm, In This Moment, Avenged Sevenfold, AFI, Saosin, and Thirty Seconds to Mars. In addition, the gangsta rap of N.W.A, and later the solo careers of Dr. Dre, Eazy-E, Ice Cube, 2Pac and Snoop Dogg, among related acts, reestablished Los Angeles (particularly the communities of Long Beach and Compton) as a center of African-American musical development and G-funk as one of hip-hop's major living styles. The 2000s saw a further flourishing of the Los Angeles rock scene with acclaimed acts such as Maroon 5 and a resurgence in West Coast hip hop in the form of rappers such as The Game. The Black Eyed Peas gained even greater popularity during this decade. The pop singers such as Belinda Carlisle, Paula Abdul, Justin Timberlake, Gwen Stefani, Fergie, Hilary Duff, Ashlee Simpson, Jesse McCartney, Aly & AJ, Vanessa Hudgens, Ashley Tisdale, Miley Cyrus, Selena Gomez, Demi Lovato, Colbie Caillat, Sara Bareilles, Katy Perry, Kesha, and Ariana Grande also anchored their singing careers in Los Angeles area as well.

In the heart of downtown Los Angeles is the Music Center of Los Angeles County. The Music Center consists of the new Walt Disney Concert Hall, the Dorothy Chandler Pavilion, the Ahmanson Theatre, and the Mark Taper Forum. The courtyard, fountain, and public art make it a beautiful location. Adding to its cultural importance, on the same street are the Los Angeles Central Library, the Museum of Contemporary Art, the Colburn School of Performing Arts, and the Cathedral of our Lady of the Angels. The Los Angeles Philharmonic Orchestra now performs at Walt Disney Concert Hall after having spent many years in residence at the Dorothy Chandler Pavilion, and performs summer concerts at the Hollywood Bowl. The Los Angeles Master Chorale also calls the Walt Disney Concert Hall home. The Dorothy Chandler Pavilion is also the residence of the Los Angeles Opera and Dance at the Music Center. The Ahmanson Theatre, Mark Taper Forum, and the Kirk Douglas Theatre in Culver City, are home to the Center Theatre Group, directed by Michael Ritchie. Contemporary Opera Los Angeles presents performances that are sung in English and set in a contemporary style and their proceeds benefit local children's education charities and animal rescue charities.

The demands of scoring thousands of hours of soundtracks for TV and movies also provides work for composers and classically trained musicians, bands, orchestras, and symphonies.

Cultural enclaves 
The Los Angeles metropolitan area is one of the most diverse urban areas in the world with hundreds of cultures represented in the region.

Ethnic enclaves 
Below is a list of many ethnic enclaves present in the Los Angeles metropolitan area, where their cultures contribute to the cosmopolitan nature of the city.

LGBTQ enclaves 
Los Angeles is also home to a couple of gay villages centered around the LGBTQ community in Los Angeles.

See also

LGBT culture in Los Angeles
List of Public Art in Los Angeles
 Media in Los Angeles

Further reading
 Mike Davis, City of Quartz, London, Verso, 1990
 Nancy Marmer, "Pop Art in California", Pop Art, ed. Lucy R. Lippard, Frederick A. Praeger, New York, 1966, pp. 149–151.
 Gloria Koenig, Iconic - Stories of LA's Most Memorable Buildings, Angel City Press, Santa Monica, 2006.
 Peter Plagens, Sunshine Muse: Contemporary Art on the West Coast, New York, Praeger Publishers, 1974.

References

External links
https://elpueblo.lacity.org/about-us